Louis A. de la Parte Jr. (July 27, 1929 – September 28, 2008) was an American politician who served for twelve years in the Florida Legislature. He was elected to the Florida House of Representatives in 1962 and served until his election to the Florida Senate in 1966. As president pro tempore, de la Parte became president of the Senate in July 1974 when the incumbent, Mallory Horne, resigned to run for the U.S. Senate. De la Parte did not preside over any legislative sessions, however, and retired from the Legislature when his term ended in November 1974.
He died after battling Alzheimer's disease in 2008.

Education
 Emory University, B.A., 1950
 University of Florida, LL.B., 1953
 University of Florida, J.D. 1967

References

External links
Louis de la Parte, Jr. Papers at the University of South Florida

1929 births
2008 deaths
de la Parte, Louis
Democratic Party Florida state senators
Politicians from Tampa, Florida
20th-century American politicians
Deaths from dementia in Florida
Deaths from Alzheimer's disease